Light in the Darkness (Italian: Luce nelle tenebre) is a 1941 Italian drama film directed by Mario Mattoli and starring Fosco Giachetti, Alida Valli and Clara Calamai. The film's sets were designed by the art director Ottavio Scotti. It was shot at the Palatino Studios in Rome.

Cast
 Fosco Giachetti as Alberto Serrani
 Alida Valli as Marina Ferri
 Clara Calamai as Clara Ferri
 Enzo Biliotti as Il professore Ferri
 Carlo Campanini as Farelli
 Carlo Lombardi as Il maestro Sartori
 Guglielmo Sinaz as Un minatore
 Ciro Berardi as Un ospite della pensione 'Iride' 
 Cesare Fantoni as Il direttore della profumeria 
 Nino Marchetti as L'impresario musicale 
 Emilio Petacci as Il portiere 
 Ugo Sasso as Un infermiere 
 Fernando Simbolotti as Il maggiordomo

References

Bibliography
 Gundle, Stephen. Mussolini's Dream Factory: Film Stardom in Fascist Italy. Berghahn Books, 2013.

External links

1941 films
1940s Italian-language films
1941 drama films
Italian black-and-white films
Films directed by Mario Mattoli
Films shot at Palatino Studios
1940s Italian films